Ramon Valadez is a former member of both the Arizona House of Representatives and the Arizona State Senate. He served in the House from January 1997 until January 2001, and in the Senate from January 2001 through January 2003. He was first elected to the House in November 1996, representing District 10, and was re-elected in 1998. In 2000, Valadez ran for the State Senate seat in the same district and won. He ran for re-election in 2002, in the newly redistricted District 29, and won. He did not take the oath of office in January 2003, and was replaced by Victor Soltero.

References

Democratic Party members of the Arizona House of Representatives
Democratic Party Arizona state senators
Hispanic and Latino American state legislators in Arizona
1967 births
Living people
University of Arizona alumni
Politicians from Tucson, Arizona
County supervisors in Arizona
20th-century American politicians
21st-century American politicians